Dotori-muk or acorn jelly is a Korean food which is a jelly made from acorn starch. Although "muk" means "jelly", when used without qualifiers, it usually refers to dotori-muk. The practice of making dotori-muk originated in mountainous areas of ancient Korea, when abundant oak trees produced enough acorns each autumn to become a viable source of food. Dotori-muk does not spoil easily, so it was used as a lunch box when traveling a long way.

Production
Despite being a rich source of starch and proteins, acorns contain large amounts of tannins and other polyphenols, which prevent the human body from digesting them properly. Harvested acorns must be properly leached of the tannins prior to consumption.

Acorns are either collected directly from the ground or knocked off the tree branches. The acorns are opened and the nutmeat ground into a fine orange-brown paste. The paste is then stirred into vats of water and the acorns' fiber is separated from the starch through sieving and settling. The starch-water mixture is collected and allowed to sit so that the tannins in the starch diffuse into the water, which is changed several times. The overall soaking time depends on the amount of tannins in the paste.

The now-tannin-free starch-water suspension should have an off-white colour. This starch is allowed to completely settle at the bottom of the vat, the water drained away and the paste collected in trays to dry. The dried starch cake is then pulverized and packaged for sale. Dotori-muk is also commercially available in powdered form, which must be mixed with water, boiled until pudding-like in consistency, then set in a flat dish.

Serving 
Like other muk, dotori-muk is most commonly eaten in the form of dotori-muk-muchim (도토리묵무침), a side dish in which small chunks of dotori-muk are seasoned and mixed with other ingredients such as slivered carrots and scallions, garlic, soy sauce, sesame oil, red chili pepper powder, and sesame seeds.

Muk-mari (묵말이) is also famous. In the Gujeuk neighbourhood of Daejeon, a "muk alley" took shape around the popular muk restaurant 'Grandma's House' (할머니집), which was founded in the late 1960s. At Expo '93 in Daejeon, Gujeuk dotori-muk was designated a representative local food and became nationally known.  Muk Cooking made by a woman started attracting people's attention. In particular, Muk-mari is made of salted seaweed (chopped seaweed powder) with its rich texture and is made of dried acorn.

History 
During the first of the Japanese invasions of Korea in the Joseon Dynasty, King Seonjo took refuge in the north. Food shortages due to the invasion made it difficult for the villagers to find something to serve the king and his entourage, so they hurriedly made them dotori-muk. Later, even after returning to the palace, King Seonjo often ate dotori-muk as a sign that he would not forget the hardships of the war.

See also
Nokdumuk – made from mung beans
Hwangpomuk – a yellow-colored jelly made from mung beans
Memilmuk – made from buckwheat
Konjac – a Japanese jelly

References

External links

Muk page

Seasoned Acorn Jelly (Dotori Muk Muchim) recipe
Blog showing the commercial process for grinding, detoxifying, straining starch to make dotorimuk
Blog showing the process at home for grinding, detoxifying, straining starch to make dotorimuk
Another blog showing the process at home for grinding, detoxifying, straining starch to make dotorimuk
Blog showing cleaned acorn starch being dried
Grocery Ninja: Eating Acorn Jelly the Unorthodox Way
Muk (food)
Korean cuisine
Ancient dishes
Gelatin